Acanthocephala declivis, the giant leaf-footed bug, is a species of North American true bugs with a range from the southern United States to Guatemala and some Caribbean islands. It can be distinguished from similar species by its much more broadly expanding pronotum, which extends much further than the abdomen, and the blunt tubercles on the midline of the anterior pronotal lobe, which is not present in other Acanthocephala species within its range.

References

External links
 Acanthocephala declivis at BugGuide.net

Hemiptera of Central America
Hemiptera of North America
Insects described in 1832
declivis